Johann Friedrich König (also: Köning; 16 October 1619 – 15 September 1664) was a German Lutheran theologian, born in Dresden. From 1656 he was a professor at the university of Rostock. He died in Rostock, aged 44.

References
Erich Beyreuther: König, Johann Friedrich. In: Neue Deutsche Biographie (NDB). Band 12, Duncker & Humblot, Berlin 1980, S. 341 f.

1619 births
1664 deaths
Clergy from Dresden
German Lutheran theologians
17th-century Latin-language writers
17th-century German Protestant theologians
German male non-fiction writers
17th-century German writers
17th-century German male writers
Academic staff of the University of Rostock

17th-century Lutheran theologians